Red Lake is a sinkhole containing a karst lake near the city of Imotski, Croatia. It is known for its numerous caves and remarkably high cliffs, reaching over 241 metres above normal water level and continuing below the water level. The total explored depth of this sinkhole is approximately 530 metres with a volume of roughly 25–30 million cubic metres, thus it is the third largest sinkhole in the world. Water drains out of the basin through underground waterways that descend below the level of the lake floor. The deepest known point of the lake is 4 metres below sea level.

The sinkhole is named after the reddish-brown colour of the surrounding cliffs, coloured by iron oxides.

Like the nearby Blue Lake, it is presumed that the lake emerged when the ceiling of a large cave hall collapsed.

The lake is inhabited with endemic and endangered spotted minnow (Delminichthys adspersus) and Imotski spined loach (Cobitis illyrica). In the dry period of the year, this fish can be occasionally seen in surrounding springs, rivers and lakes, suggesting that there is an underground connection between Red Lake and other water bodies.

At the 13th International Congress of Speleology in 2001, new findings were revealed. An inflow cave-shaped canal that measured approximately 30 × 30 metres was discovered in the eastern part of the lake at a depth of 175 metres.

References

Sources

External links

Stamp by Croatian post

Lakes of Croatia
Sinkholes of Europe
Karst formations of Croatia
Landforms of Split-Dalmatia County
Caves of Croatia
Imotski